The Le Cabri was a French automobile manufactured from 1924 to 1925. The builder, Marcel Cabon, born in 1905 Neuilly, Haut de Seine France, was nineteen years old. A cyclecar with a side valve 980cc Ruby engine, 4 cylinders monobloc,5 hp, 475 kg.
It was built in Chevreuse Seine & Oise France. Few were constructed before the company folded.

References

David Burgess Wise, The New Illustrated Encyclopedia of Automobiles.
Yann Cabon, builder's son, information, flyer and pictures.

Cabri, Le
Cyclecars